Plotinnaya is a rural locality (a railway station) of West Siberian Railway in Kamensky District, Altai Krai, Russia. The population was 746 as of 2016. There are 7 streets.

Geography 
Plotinnaya is located on the right bank of the Ob River, 8 km east of Kamen-na-Obi (the district's administrative centre) by road. Kamen-na-Obi is the nearest rural locality.

References 

Rural localities in Kamensky District, Altai Krai